Stelios Kypreos (born 14 November 1998) is a Greek professional footballer who plays as a goalkeeper for Cypriot Second Division club ASIL Lysi.

References

1998 births
Living people
Greek footballers
Greek expatriate footballers
Football League (Greece) players
Gamma Ethniki players
Cypriot Second Division players
Panelefsiniakos F.C. players
Ilisiakos F.C. players
ASIL Lysi players
Association football goalkeepers